Lina Rodriguez is a Colombian-Canadian filmmaker and screenwriter, most noted for her 2022 documentary film My Two Voices (Mis dos voces).

A native of Bogotá, Rodriguez moved to Canada to study film at York University. She wrote and directed a number of short films before releasing her debut feature film Señoritas in 2013, which premiered at the Cartagena Film Festival. She followed up in 2016 with This Time Tomorrow (Mañana a esta hora), which premiered at the Locarno Film Festival.

Her short documentary film ante mis ojos premiered in the Wavelengths program at the 2018 Toronto International Film Festival, and Here and There (Aquí y allá) premiered at the 2019 Vancouver International Film Festival.

In 2020, Rodriguez was selected by former TIFF programmer Michèle Maheux as the recipient of the $50,000 "pay it forward" grant from Maheux's Clyde Gilmour Award package.

My Two Voices premiered at the 72nd Berlin International Film Festival, and had its Canadian premiere at the 2022 Hot Docs Canadian International Documentary Festival. In the same year she released her third narrative fiction film So Much Tenderness, which premiered at the 2022 Toronto International Film Festival.

She is based in Toronto, Ontario.

References

External links

21st-century Canadian screenwriters
Canadian women screenwriters
Canadian documentary film directors
Canadian women film directors
Colombian screenwriters
Colombian women writers
Colombian documentary filmmakers
Colombian women film directors
Colombian emigrants to Canada
Film directors from Toronto
People from Bogotá
Writers from Toronto
York University alumni
Year of birth missing (living people)
Living people
Canadian women documentary filmmakers